Pool C (Skopje) of the 2022 Billie Jean King Cup Europe/Africa Zone Group III was one of four pools in the Europe/Africa zone of the 2022 Billie Jean King Cup. Four teams competed in a round robin competition, with each team proceeding to their respective sections of the play-offs: the top team played for advancement to Group II in 2023.

Standings 

Standings are determined by: 1. number of wins; 2. number of matches; 3. in two-team ties, head-to-head records; 4. in three-team ties, (a) percentage of matches won (head-to-head records if two teams remain tied), then (b) percentage of sets won (head-to-head records if two teams remain tied), then (c) percentage of games won (head-to-head records if two teams remain tied), then (d) Billie Jean King Cup rankings.

Round-robin

South Africa vs. Botswana

North Macedonia vs. Uganda

South Africa vs. Uganda

North Macedonia vs. Botswana

South Africa vs. North Macedonia

Botswana vs. Uganda

References

External links 
 Billie Jean King Cup website

2022 Billie Jean King Cup Europe/Africa Zone